Alexandros II may refer to:

 Alexander II of Macedon, king of Macedon in 371–369 BC
 Pope Alexander II of Alexandria, ruled in 702–729
 Patriarch Alexander II of Alexandria, Greek Patriarch of Alexandria in 1059–1062